Tokmovo is a village (selo) in Kovylkinsky District of the Republic of Mordovia, Russia.

References

Rural localities in Mordovia
Kovylkinsky District
Insarsky Uyezd